This is a list of governors for Värmland County of Sweden. Värmland separated from Närke and Värmland County in 1779, see List of governors of Örebro County before that date.
Johan Gustaf Uggla (1779–1793)
Nils Nilsson Silverskjöld (1793–1802)
Arvid von Nolcken (1802–1807)
Axel von Rosen (1808–1809)
Olof af Wibeli (1809–1813)
Johan Didrik af Wingård (1814–1840)
Carl Fredrik Hammarhielm (1840–1841)
Hans Fredrik Oldevig (1842–1864)
Carl Rudolf Ekström (1864–1870)
Johan Henrik Rosenswärd (1870–1873)
Henrik Wilhelm Gyllenram (1873–1885)
Henrik Adolf Widmark (1885–1889)
Emil Adolf Malmborg (1889–1901)
Gerhard Dyrssen (1901–1921)
Abraham Unger (1921–1936)
Ivar Wennerström (1936–1945)
Axel Westling (1945–1957)
Gustaf Nilsson (1957–1967)
Rolf Edberg (1967–1977)
Bengt Norling (1977–1990)
Ingemar Eliasson (1990–2002)
Kerstin Wallin (2003–2004)
Eva Eriksson (politician)Eva Eriksson (2004–2012)
Kenneth Johansson (2012–2018)
Johan Blom (2019–2019) (acting)
Georg Andrén (2019–present)

Footnotes

References

Varmland